The 1913 Maryland Aggies football team was an American football team that represented the Maryland Agricultural College (which became Maryland State College in 1916 and part of the University of Maryland in 1920) as an independent during the 1913 college football season. In their third season under head coach Curley Byrd, the Aggies compiled a 6–3 record, shut out five of nine opponents, and outscored all opponents by a total of 184 to 139.

Halfback Morris was the team captain.

Schedule

References

Maryland
Maryland Terrapins football seasons
Maryland Aggies football